The Family Friend is a 2006 Italian film directed by Paolo Sorrentino. It was entered into the 2006 Cannes Film Festival.

Plot
Geremia, an aging tailor/money lender, is a repulsive, mean, stingy man who lives in his shabby house with his scornful, bedridden mother. He has a morbid, obsessive relationship with money and he uses it to insinuate himself into other people's affairs, pretending to be the "family friend". One day he is asked by a man to lend him money for the wedding of Rosalba, his daughter.

Cast
 Giacomo Rizzo - Geremia De Geremei
 Laura Chiatti - Rosalba De Luca
 Gigi Angelillo - Saverio
 Marco Giallini - Attanasio
 Barbara Valmorin - Nonna al bingo
 Luisa De Santis - Silvia
 Clara Bindi - Madre di Geremia
 Roberta Fiorentini - Moglie di Saverio
 Elia Schilton - Teasuro
 Lorenzo Gioielli - Montanaro
 Emilio De Marchi - Chef
 Giorgio Colangeli - Massa
 Fabio Grossi - Cognato di Saverio
 Lucia Ragni - Cassiera
 Fabrizio Bentivoglio - Gino

References

External links
Il sito ufficiale del film
Recensione film L'amico di famiglia

2006 films
2006 drama films
2000s Italian-language films
Films directed by Paolo Sorrentino
Italian drama films
Films with screenplays by Paolo Sorrentino
2000s Italian films
Fandango (Italian company) films